Carbondale City Hall and Courthouse, also known as the Carbondale Municipal Building, is a historic city hall and courthouse building located at Carbondale, Lackawanna County, Pennsylvania. It was built in 1892-1894, and is a brick and bluestone building in the  Romanesque-style.  It consists of five-story, square, corner tower; three-story wing; and two-story brick wing.  The three-story wing, along with the tower, houses the Carbondale City Hall.  It features a massive, half-circle primary entrance and rusticated stone and brick turrets. The two-story wing was built in 1859 as the courthouse, and incorporated into the new building.

It was added to the National Register of Historic Places in 1983.

The building's third floor houses the Carbondale Historical Society and Museum.

References

Courthouses on the National Register of Historic Places in Pennsylvania
Romanesque Revival architecture in Pennsylvania
Government buildings completed in 1894
Buildings and structures in Lackawanna County, Pennsylvania
National Register of Historic Places in Lackawanna County, Pennsylvania
City and town halls in Pennsylvania
City and town halls on the National Register of Historic Places in Pennsylvania
Courthouses in Pennsylvania
Carbondale, Pennsylvania